Hubert Hammerschmied (6 August 1914–19 February 1994) was an Austrian cross-country skier. He competed in the men's 18 kilometre event at the 1948 Winter Olympics.

References

External links

1914 births
1994 deaths
Austrian male cross-country skiers
Austrian male Nordic combined skiers
Austrian male ski jumpers
Olympic cross-country skiers of Austria
Olympic Nordic combined skiers of Austria
Olympic ski jumpers of Austria
Cross-country skiers at the 1948 Winter Olympics
Nordic combined skiers at the 1948 Winter Olympics
Ski jumpers at the 1948 Winter Olympics
Place of birth missing
20th-century Austrian people